The 2013 World Rowing Championships were World Rowing Championships that were held from 25 August to 1 September 2013 at Tangeum Lake, Chungju in South Korea. The annual week-long rowing regatta was organized by FISA (the International Rowing Federation). In non-Olympic Games years the regatta is the highlight of the international rowing calendar.

Medal summary

Men's events
 Non-Olympic classes

Women's events
 Non-Olympic classes

Para-rowing (adaptive) events
All boat classes (except LTAMix2x) are also Paralympic.

Event codes

Adaptive rowing categories — AS: arms & shoulders, TA: trunk & arms, LTA: legs, trunk, arms

Medal table

References

External links

 Official website

World Rowing Championships
Rowing competitions in South Korea
World Rowing Championships
World Rowing Championships
International sports competitions hosted by South Korea
Rowing
Rowing